Forges-les-Bains is a commune in the Essonne department in Île-de-France in northern France. Inhabitants of Forges-les-Bains are known as Forgeois.

See also
Communes of the Essonne department

References

External links

Mayors of Essonne Association 

Communes of Essonne